Pterostylis dilatata, commonly known as the robust snail orchid, is a species of orchid which is endemic to the south-west of Western Australia. Non-flowering plants have a rosette of leaves but flowering plants lack a rosette and have a single green and white flower on a flowering stem with stem leaves. The flowers appear in winter and have lateral sepals which almost close off the front of the flower.

Description
Pterostylis dilatata is a terrestrial,  perennial, deciduous, herb with an underground tuber and when not flowering, a rosette lying flat on the ground. The dorsal sepal and petals form a hood over the column with the petals flared and the dorsal sepal having a short point. The lateral sepals are in close contact with the gales and have a bulging sinus between them. Flowering occurs from May to August.

Taxonomy and naming
Pterostylis dilatata was first formally described in 1984 by Alex George from a specimen collected near Bluff Knoll. The description was published in Nuytsia. The specific epithet (dilatata) is a Latin word meaning "spread out", "enlarged" or "extended" referring to the bloated base of the flower.

Distribution and habitat
The robust snail orchid grows in shrubland, woodland and in soil pockets on granite outcrops between Geraldton and Israelite Bay in the Avon Wheatbelt, Esperance Plains, Geraldton Sandplains, Jarrah Forest, Swan Coastal Plain biogeographic regions of Western Australia.

Conservation status
Pterostylis dilatata is classified as "not threatened" by the Government of Western Australia Department of Parks and Wildlife.

References

dilatata
Endemic orchids of Australia
Orchids of Western Australia
Plants described in 1984
Endemic flora of Western Australia